The Lithuania men's national under-18 ice hockey team is the men's national under-18 ice hockey team of Lithuania. The team is controlled by the Lithuanian Ice Hockey Federation, a member of the International Ice Hockey Federation. The team represents Lithuania at the IIHF World U18 Championships.

International competitions

IIHF World U18 Championships

1999: 3rd in Division I Europe
2000: 6th in Division I Europe
2001: 8th in Division II
2002: 6th in Division III
2003: 5th in Division II Group B
2004: 4th in Division II Group B
2005: 2nd in Division II Group B
2006: 2nd in Division II Group B
2007: 1st in Division II Group B
2008: 3rd in Division I Group A
2009: 5th in Division I Group A
2010: 6th in Division I Group B

2011: 3rd in Division II Group B
2012: 3rd in Division II Group A
2013: 5th in Division II Group A
2014: 1st in Division II Group A
2015: 6th in Division I Group B
2016: 3rd in Division II Group A
2017: 3rd in Division II Group A
2018: 2nd in Division II Group A
2019: 2nd in Division II Group A
2020: Cancelled
2021: Cancelled
2022: 4th in Division II Group A

External links
Lithuania at IIHF.com

Ice hockey in Lithuania
National under-18 ice hockey teams
Ice hockey